The 2022 National Rugby League finals series was a tournament staged to determine the winner of the 2022 Telstra Premiership season. The series was played over four weekends in September and October, culminating in the 2022 NRL Grand Final on 2 October 2022 won by the Penrith Panthers.

The top eight teams from the 2022 NRL season qualified for the finals series. NRL finals series were continuously played under this format since 2012.

Qualification

Finals structure 

The system used for the 2022 NRL finals series is a final eight system. The top four teams in the eight receive the "double chance" when they play in week-one qualifying finals, such that if a top-four team loses in the first week it still remains in the finals, playing a semi-final the next week against the winner of an elimination final. The bottom four of the eight play knock-out games – only the winners survive and move on to the next week. Home ground advantage goes to the team with the higher ladder position in the first two weeks and to the qualifying final winners in the third week.

In the second week, the winners of the qualifying finals receive a bye to the third week. The losers of the qualifying final plays the elimination finals winners in a semi-final. In the third week, the winners of the semi-finals from week two play the winners of the qualifying finals in the first week. The winners of those matches move on to the Grand Final.

Venues

The Grand Final as well as the Sydney-based preliminary finals were held at Stadium Australia, with the Grand Final returning to Sydney after a one-year absence. The North Queensland Cowboys hosted one preliminary final at North Queensland Stadium. All matches in the first two rounds were played at the home stadium of the team with the higher ladder position, except that the semi-final between Cronulla-Sutherland and South Sydney was held at the Sydney Football Stadium rather than Endeavour Field where Cronulla-Sutherland had hosted a qualifying final the previous week.

Fixtures

Summary

Bracket

Matches

First week: Qualifying and elimination finals

Second week: Semi-finals

Third week: Preliminary finals

Fourth week: Grand final

References

2022 NRL season
2022 in Australian rugby league